Verbena rigida, known as slender vervain or tuberous vervain, is a flowering herbaceous perennial plant in the family Verbenaceae. It is native to Brazil and Argentina, and is not fully hardy in temperate climates, where consequently it is grown from seed as an annual.

Numerous cultivars have been selected for garden use.

The species has gained the Royal Horticultural Society's Award of Garden Merit.

References

rigida
Flora of South America
Plants described in 1827